Pied-piping with inversion is a special word order phenomenon found in some languages, for example,  languages in the Mesoamerican linguistic area.

Introduction

The phenomenon was first named and identified as an areal characteristic of the Mesoamerican linguistic area in Smith Stark (1988).  Some sources also refer to pied-piping with inversion as "secondary wh-movement".
The phenomenon can be described as follows:
the language has wh-movement.
the language has pied-piping.  That is, when certain words undergo wh-movement, not only the interrogative word, but the phrase which contains this word moves.
the word order within the pied-piped phrase is different from the order of ordinary phrases.

The following examples from San Dionisio Ocotepec Zapotec illustrate the phenomenon.  As the following example shows, a possessor normally follows the noun that is possessed in this language (Broadwell 2001):

If the possessor is questioned, then the whole noun phrase must pied-pipe to the beginning of the sentence.  However, the order of the initial phrase must have the possessor before the possessed:

The difference in order between the noun phrases in (1) and (2) illustrates pied-piping with inversion.  (1) shows the ordinary order in which the noun is the first element of the noun phrase; (2) shows the inverted order found in the pied-piped noun phrase.

The following examples from Tzotzil (Aissen 1996) show the same process:

Types of phrases that show pied-piping with inversion
Pied-piping with inversion is most often found in noun phrases (NP), prepositional phrases (PP), and quantifier phrases (QP).  The following example, also from San Dionisio Ocotepec Zapotec, shows pied-piping with inversion in a quantifier phrase (Broadwell 2001):

As this example shows, languages may differ in the degree to which pied-piping with inversion is obligatory in different types of phrases.  So (2) above shows that the interrogative must be initial in a pied-piped noun phrase.  But (5) shows that the interrogative is only optionally initial in a pied-piped quantifier phrase.

The following example, from Quiegolani Zapotec (Black 2000) shows pied-piping with inversion in a prepositional phrase:

Environments for pied-piping with inversion
The most frequently cited type of sentence with pied-piping with inversion is a wh-question.  However, a number of Mesoamerican languages also show fronting of negative or indefinite phrases to a position before the verb.

Fronted negative and indefinite phrases may also show pied-piping with inversion in some languages, as in this example from San Dionisio Ocotepec Zapotec:

The noun phrase 'anyone's dog' has been fronted to a position before the verb, and shows the same pied-piping with inversion seen in other syntactic environments.

Languages that show pied-piping with inversion

Pied-piping with inversion seems to be found in all Mesoamerican languages. It is documented in many of them, including several Zapotec languages (San Dionisio Ocotepec Zapotec, Tlacolula de Matamoros Zapotec, and Quiegolani Zapotec), several Mayan languages (Kʼicheʼ, Kaqchikel, Chuj, Tzotzil), and several Mixtecan languages (Ocotepec Mixtec, and Copala Triqui).

Pied-piping with inversion is unusual outside Mesoamerica but is documented in Sasak, an Austronesian language of Indonesia (Austin 2001).

A somewhat similar phenomenon is found in a number of Germanic languages, in which certain pronominal objects of prepositions appear before the preposition. The following Dutch examples show that ordinary objects follow the preposition op 'on', while the pronouns er 'it', daar 'there', and hier 'here' precede the preposition:

 Ik reken [op je steun]. ("I count on your support.")
 Ik reken erop/daarop/hierop ("I count on it/on that/on this.")

These examples show inversion of a prepositional phrase, but this inversion does not necessarily occur in contexts of pied-piping.

Possibly related is the phenomenon known as swiping, which a wh-phrase is inverted with a governing preposition in the context of sluicing:

 Ralph was arguing, but I don't know who with.

Such inversion requires pied-piping but also ellipsis unlike Meso-American languages.

See also
 Syntax

Notes

References

 Aissen, Judith. 1996. Pied-piping, abstract agreement, and functional projections in Tzotzil.  Natural language and linguistic theory 14:447-491.
 Austin, Peter. 2001. Content questions in Sasak, eastern Indonesia: an OT syntax account.  manuscript. University of Melbourne.
 Black, Cheryl. 2000.  Quiegolani Zapotec syntax: A Principles and Parameters Account. Dallas: SIL International and UT Arlington Publications in Linguistics 136.
 Broadwell, George Aaron. 1999.  Focus alignment and optimal order in Zapotec. Proceedings of the 35th Chicago Linguistics Society.
 Broadwell, George Aaron. 2001. Optimal order and pied-piping in San Dionisio Zapotec, in Peter Sells, ed. Formal and empirical issues in optimality theory. Stanford: CSLI.
 Broadwell, George Aaron. 2002.  Constraint symmetry in Optimality-Theoretic Syntax.  In Miriam Butt and Tracy Holloway King, eds. Proceedings of the Lexical Functional Grammar 2000 Conference. Stanford, CA: CSLI Publications.
 Broadwell, George Aaron and Brook Danielle Lillehaugen. 2006.  Pied-piping with inversion in Tlacolula de Matamoros Zapotec.  Presented at the Society for the Study of the Indigenous Languages of the Americas, Albuquerque, Jan 2006.
 Broadwell, George Aaron and Michael Parrish Key. 2004. Pied-piping with inversion in Copala Trique.  Presented at the Society for the Study of the Indigenous Languages of the Americas, San Francisco, Jan 2004.
 Eberhardt, Roy. 1999. Questions and inversion in Ocotepec Mixtec. Work Papers of the Summer Institute of Linguistics, University of North Dakota Session 43. 
 Heck, Fabian. 2004. A theory of pied-piping. Ph.D. thesis, University of Leipzig.
 Merchant, Jason. 2002. Swiping in Germanic. In C. Jan-Wouter Zwart and Werner Abraham (eds.), Studies in Comparative Germanic Syntax, 289-315. John Benjamins: Amsterdam.
 van Riemsdijk, Henk. 1978. A case study in syntactic markedness: The binding nature of prepositional phrases. Foris: Dordrecht.
 Sells, Peter, ed. 2001a. Formal and Empirical Issues in Optimality Theory. Stanford: CSLI.
 Smith Stark, Thomas. 1988. ‘Pied-piping’ con inversion en preguntas parciales.  Ms. Centro de estudios lingüísticos y literarios, Colegio de México y Seminario de lenguas indígenas.
 Trechsel, Frank. 2000. A CCG Approach to Tzotzil Pied-Piping.  Natural Language and Linguistic Theory 18: 611-63.

P01
Indigenous languages of Central America
Indigenous languages of North America
Syntactic relationships
Generative syntax
Syntax
Syntactic transformation